Mechower See is a lake in the Nordwestmecklenburg district in Mecklenburg-Vorpommern, Germany. At an elevation of 31.5 m, its surface area is 1.64 km².

See also 
 List of lakes in Germany

Lakes of Mecklenburg-Western Pomerania
Nature reserves in Mecklenburg-Western Pomerania
LMechowerSee